Lupche Bay (Guba Lupche) is a body of water off the southwestern coast of the Kola Peninsula, Murmansk Oblast, Russia. Lupche-Savino River flows to the bay.

References

Bays of the Arctic Ocean
Bays of Murmansk Oblast